Abberton is a village in Essex, England. The village is in the borough of Colchester and in the parliamentary constituency of North Essex. The town is served by Abberton and Langenhoe Parish Council.

Etymology

The word Abberton is derived from 'Eadburg's estate' (Ēadburge + tūn).

History
Abberton is recorded in the Domesday Book of 1086-87 as Edburghetuna and as Edburgetuna in the Hundred of Winstree, when it was part of the lands of Count Eustace in Essex, held by Ralph de Marcy and further held by Ranulf Peverel in demesne; it was held by Siward, a free man, as a manor in the time of King Edward the Confessor before the Norman Conquest of 1066. It was later recorded as Eadburgetona in 1108, Adbur(u)g(h)(e)ton(e) in 1208–1321, Adburthon in 1280, also Abberton from 1230.

Abberton was among the villages which suffered damage from the 1884 Colchester earthquake: chimneys had fallen to the ground, brick walls had cracked and many side walls of houses had collapsed; the rectory which was being built at the time also suffered considerable damage.

Church
The Church at Abberton is St Andrew. It is a Grade II* listed building and originates from at least the 14th century. It is located at the end of Rectory Lane, approximately three hundred yards from Abberton Reservoir.

References

External links

 

Villages in Essex